Illicit financial flows, in economics, are a form of illegal capital flight that occurs when money is illegally earned, transferred, or spent. This money is intended to disappear from any record in the country of origin, and earnings on the stock of illicit financial flows outside a country generally do not return to the country of origin.

Illicit financial flows can be generated in a variety of ways that are not revealed in national accounts or balance of payments figures, including trade mispricing, bulk cash movements, hawala transactions, and smuggling.

There are several economic models used to provide estimates of illicit financial flows and capital flight. The two most common methods are the World Bank Residual Model and the DOTS-based Trade Mispricing Model, which uses the IMF's Direction of Trade Statistics (DOTS) database to analyze discrepancies in trade statistics between partner countries.  Another way to estimate trade mispricing is with the IPPS-based model, which was developed by John Zdanowicz of Florida International University. This method uses individual import and export transactions of the United States with the rest of the world to find inconsistencies in export and import prices. Economists also use hot money (Narrow) Method and the Dooley Method in these estimates.

A 2013 paper, authorized by Raymond W. Baker, Director of the Global Financial Integrity estimated illicit financial flows "out of developing countries are approximately $1 trillion a year". This study also found that China, Russia, and Mexico accounted for the three largest shares of worldwide illicit financial flows.

The  United Nations Sustainable Development Goal 16 has a target to significantly reduce illicit financial flows and strengthen recovery and return of stolen assets by 2030.

Pakistan 
In Pakistan estimates of illicit financial flows put over $10 billion as escaping  taxation and being siphoned off outside the country. This is with nearly one third of the population living below the poverty line.

Swaziland 
Swaziland lost approximately $556 million to illicit financial flows in 2012 and a record of $1.139 billion in 2007.

See also
 Capital flight
 Money laundering
 Task Force on Financial Integrity and Economic Development

References

Economic globalization
Imperialism studies
International finance
International trade